Jure Velepec (born 10 June 1965) is a Slovenian biathlete. He competed at the 1984, 1988, 1992 and the 1994 Winter Olympics.

References

1965 births
Living people
Slovenian male biathletes
Olympic biathletes of Yugoslavia
Olympic biathletes of Slovenia
Biathletes at the 1984 Winter Olympics
Biathletes at the 1988 Winter Olympics
Biathletes at the 1992 Winter Olympics
Biathletes at the 1994 Winter Olympics
Sportspeople from Ljubljana
20th-century Slovenian people